Chiloepalpus is a genus of flies in the family Tachinidae.

Species
Chiloepalpus aurifacies Townsend, 1927
Chiloepalpus aureus (Aldrich, 1926)
Chiloepalpus factilis (Reinhard, 1964)

References

Tachinidae